Nicholas Kowgios (born November 19, 1962) is a former American football running back who played for the Detroit Lions of the National Football League (NFL). He played college football at Lafayette College.

References 

Living people
Lafayette Leopards football players
1962 births
American football running backs
Detroit Lions players